

Lady of Montpellier

House of William, 986–1213

House of Aragon, 1213–1349

Part of the Crown of France (1349–1371)

House of Évreux, 1371–1378, 1381–1382

Notes

Sources
SEIGNEURS de MONTPELLIER

Montpellier
 
Montpellier
Montpellier